Alfaaz – The Boy Next Door is a studio album by Alfaaz and Yo Yo Honey Singh.

Track listing

References

2011 albums
Punjabi-language albums